David da Silva Lima (born July 25, 1990 in Rio de Janeiro), known as Zeca, is a Brazilian football left back who currently plays for Santa Cruz Futebol Clube.

External links
  Ogol
  Soccerway

1990 births
Living people
Association football forwards
Brazilian footballers
Santa Cruz Futebol Clube players
Association football midfielders
Footballers from Rio de Janeiro (city)